Rekha IPS is a 2008 Indian Tamil-language police drama starring Anu Hasan, Vijay Adhiraj, Sanjeev, Priyadarshini, Pollachi Babu, V.S. Raghavan and Shyam Ganesh. It was aired on Kalaignar TV for 401 episodes. The show was directed by B. Nithiyanantham and O.N. Rathnam with the story by Chithra Lakshmanan.

From April 17, 2017, the show was re-launched in Kalaignar TV and it replaced by historical drama Thenpandi Singam.

Synopsis
The story follows focusing on a Police officer, Rekha (Anu Hasan) who tries to find out her kidnapped sister several years before. Gowsik (Vijay Adhiraj) as her former lover subverts the ideas of Rekha makes everyone keeps their fingers crossed.

Cast

Main cast
 Anu Hasan as Rekha a police officer with her matured performance as the police officer tries to find out her kidnapped sister several years before. 
 Vijay Adhiraj as Gowsik
 Shridhar as (Rekha Husband)
 Shyam Ganesh as Ram (Radha younger Brother)
 Sanjeev
 Brinda Das as Radha

Additional cast

Original soundtrack

Title song
It was written by lyricist Piraisoodan, composed by the music director C. Sathya. It was sung by Balram.

Soundtrack

Notes
 Anu Hasan makes a TV Serial comeback through this drama after a decade.
 It was 1st Women Police and Action Drama in Tamil Language Serials.

International broadcast
The Series was released in 2008 on Kalaignar TV. The Show was also broadcast internationally on Channel's international distribution. It aired in Sri Lanka, Singapore, Malaysia, South East Asia, Middle East, Oceania, South Africa and Sub Saharan Africa on Kalaignar TV and also aired in United States, Canada, Europe on Kalaignar Ayngaran TV.

  In Sri Lanka Tamil Channel on Vasantham TV.
  Tamil Channel on Deepam TV.

References

External links
 

Kalaignar TV television series
Tamil-language police television series
2008 Tamil-language television series debuts
2017 Tamil-language television series debuts
2010s Tamil-language television series
2010 Tamil-language television series endings
Tamil-language television shows